There were two battles of Kashgar, The battles were fought at the old city of Kashgar (as opposed to the "new city") in Xinjiang.

 Battle of Kashgar (1933) 
 Battle of Kashgar (1934)